Gurbuz or Gürbüz may refer to:

 Gürbüz Doğan Ekşioğlu (born 1954), Turkish cartoonist and graphics designer
 Gurbuz District, Khost Province, Afghanistan
 Gürbüz, Hani